Qatalyst Partners is an American technology-focused boutique investment bank that specialises in mergers and acquisitions. It is based in San Francisco with an additional office in London.

History

Qatalyst Partners was founded in March 2008 by Frank Quattrone, Adrian Dollard, and Jonathan Turner.  

In 2012, CEO Frank Quattrone was named the "Financial Dealmaker of the Year" by the San Francisco Business Journal for his work with the firm.

Deals

The company's advisory and acquisition deals have included eBay, LinkedIn, LifeSize, Google, GoDaddy.com, Taleo, NetSuite, Motorola, and others. 

Qatalyst has acted as lead adviser to various deals including

 LinkedIn's sale to Microsoft for $26.2 billion 
 Analog Devices acquisition of Linear Technology for $15 billion 
 KLA Tencor's sale to Lam Research for $11.5 billion 
 NetSuite's $9.4 billion sale to Oracle
 HomeAway's $3.9 billion sale to Expedia

See also
Frank Quattrone

References

Further reading
 Fortune "Qatalyst Partners - Fortune Tech"

Investment banks in the United States
American companies established in 2008
Financial services companies established in 2008
Banks established in 2008
Companies based in San Francisco
2008 establishments in California